Ben and Tan are a Danish duo consisting of Benjamin Rosenbohm (born 3 June 2002) and Tanne Balcells (born 15 January 1998). They were due to represent Denmark in the Eurovision Song Contest 2020 in Rotterdam, with the song "Yes", until it was cancelled due to the COVID-19 pandemic.

In 2019, they both participated in the twelfth season of the talent show X Factor and became a duo after the show ended.

Career

2019: X Factor

Rosenbohm and Balcells met in 2019 during the twelfth series of X Factor. Rosenbohm entered the competition alone, whereas Balcells competed as a part of girl group Echo. Both were successful in the auditions, 5 Chair Challenge, and Bootcamp, making it through to the live televised shows.

Balcells, as a part of Echo, made it to the semi-final, but was eliminated after the group received the fewest public votes, finishing the competition in fourth place.

Rosenbohm made it to the final where he performed three songs, including what would have been his winner's single, but was not successful and finished runner-up to Kristian Kjærlund.

Performances

2020: Eurovision Song Contest

 
On 7 March 2020, Rosenbohm and Balcells were one of 10 acts that participated in the Dansk Melodi Grand Prix, an annual music competition held in Denmark to determine the country's representative for the Eurovision Song Contest. The pair won with their song "Yes", receiving 61% of the vote, and were therefore due to represent Denmark in the Eurovision Song Contest.

On 18 March 2020, the European Broadcasting Union announced the cancellation of the Eurovision Song Contest 2020 due to the uncertainty surrounding the spread of coronavirus throughout Europe.

2021: Dansk Melodi Grand Prix
The duo tried again to represent Denmark in Eurovision trying to participate in the DMGP 2021 submitting their single "Iron Heart" as a proposal, but it was rejected by DR, the song was also rejected by SVT for Melodifestivalen 2021.

Personal life
Rosenbohm was born in Berlin, Germany to a Malagasy father and German mother and moved to Denmark at a young age. Balcells was born in Barcelona, Spain to a Spanish father and Danish mother before moving to Denmark.

Discography

Singles

Notes

References

External links

Danish pop music groups
Eurovision Song Contest entrants of 2020
X Factor (Danish TV series) contestants
Eurovision Song Contest entrants for Denmark